The 2021–22 Phoenix Suns season was their 54th season of the franchise in the National Basketball Association (NBA), as well as their 29th season at the currently named Footprint Center, their first full season under that name after taking over the naming rights to the previously named Phoenix Suns Arena on July 16, 2021, during the 2021 NBA Finals.

The Suns entered the season as the defending Western Conference champions and were attempting to return to the NBA Finals for the second consecutive year. On March 24, with a win over the Denver Nuggets, the Phoenix Suns clinched the #1 spot in the Western Conference and the league for the first time since 2005. With the Suns 63rd win over the Los Angeles Lakers on April 5 (which also eliminated them from playoff/play-in contention), the Suns set a franchise record for most wins in a season, surpassing the 1992–93 and 2004–05 teams with 62.

In the playoffs, the Suns defeated the New Orleans Pelicans in six games in the first round. The Suns then faced the Dallas Mavericks, where they lost in seven games, becoming the third team to have 64 or more wins and not reach the Conference Finals after the 2006–07 Dallas Mavericks and 2015–16 San Antonio Spurs.

Off-season

Draft

The Suns agreed to trade their 29th pick and Jevon Carter to the Brooklyn Nets in exchange for Landry Shamet.

Free agency

For this season, free agency began over a month later than it usually does, starting on August 2, 2021, at 6:00 P.M. EST instead of by June 30 or July 1 like in previous free agency periods due to the aftermath of the 2019–20 NBA season suspension affecting some of the timing for a few things with this season's offseason period. However, instead of starting the free agency period to something like July 31 akin to last season's free agency period starting two days after the last season's draft back on November 20, 2020, free agency began on the proper five days off before free agency begins. Furthermore, official signings were made four days after the starting free agency period (which in this case began on August 6, 2021, instead of by late November like last season), which was on schedule for the five day moratorium period the NBA holds. For this season, the Suns had (starting with the most expensive players downward) E'Twaun Moore, Langston Galloway, Cameron Payne, Abdel Nader, Frank Kaminsky III, and Torrey Craig all entering free agency this year due to all of them signing (or agreeing to) their veteran's minimum salaries for their respective deals last season. In addition to them, superstar point guard Chris Paul also declined his player's option that would have allowed him to get $44,211,146 in the final season of his massive contract he first signed back when he was with the Houston Rockets in 2018, though he's expected to receive a 3-year deal worth $90 million with the Suns in free agency. Not only that, in addition to all of these players, Ty-Shon Alexander's two-way contract was projected to go into its second year with Phoenix, which initially left them only one likely open two-way contract for the season earlier on.

On August 2, the Suns agreed to new deals for not just back-up point guard Cameron Payne, but also All-Star point guard Chris Paul, both of which became official by August 6. With Payne, his new deal gave him a three-year contract that's worth a total of $19 million, with his third year only guaranteeing him $2 million out of $6,500,000 that would be received there. However, with Chris Paul, his new contract allows him to receive a partially guaranteed four-year deal that would fully grant him up to $120 million, though only his first two years are fully guaranteed, with his third year being partially guaranteed (half of his salary is fully guaranteed for that season) and his final season in that deal being non-guaranteed. Not only that, but they also agreed to sign Denver Nuggets center JaVale McGee (who was also a part of Team U.S.A. for the 2020 Summer Olympics alongside Devin Booker) to a one-year deal for $5 million, though his agreement on August 2 was made official on August 16 instead. However, the Suns also lost Torrey Craig to the Indiana Pacers on August 2, with Craig agreeing to sign a two-year deal worth $10 million for Indiana, which was made official by August 20. A day after that, the Suns also re-signed Abdel Nader to a two-year deal worth $4,200,000 (second year being a team option), with his signing also being official on August 6. On August 5, Frank Kaminsky III agreed to another one-year deal worth his veteran's minimum to return to Phoenix, with former Suns point guard Elfrid Payton agreeing to a one-year deal worth his own veteran's minimum to reunite with the Suns, albeit as a third-string point guard this time around. Kaminsky's deal was made official by August 9, while Payton's was completed a day later.

On August 26, the Suns announced that they had officially waived Ty-Shon Alexander from his second year of his two-way contract he had signed from his previous season with the team. On September 7, the Suns confirmed that they replaced Alexander's spot with that of former Washington Wizards (and technically San Antonio Spurs) player Chandler Hutchison as a two-way contract player for this season only due to it being his last eligible year for such a contract, with Ty-Shon Alexander confirmed to join the Segafredo Virtus Bologna in Italy later on that same day. The next day, E'Twaun Moore agreed to a one-year deal to return to the Orlando Magic after last playing with Orlando from 2012 to 2014. On September 22, Chasson Randle was confirmed to be a training camp signing for the Suns that's looking to gain a spot on the roster properly in October, which was made official on September 26. However, Randle was officially waived after their preseason ended on October 16. Then, on September 24, Langston Galloway was confirmed to sign a training camp deal with the Golden State Warriors, though he was waived from the Warriors on October 9. With regards to rookie scale contract extensions, Mikal Bridges was given a 4-year, $90 million extension with the Suns on October 17, while Landry Shamet was given a 4-year, $43 million extension with Phoenix a day later. However, Deandre Ayton failed to get a contract extension of his own before the deadline passed, making him a restricted free agent entering next season. On October 22, the Suns filled their second two-way contract with small power forward Ish Wainright, a Ugandan-American that previously last played for the SIG Strasbourg in France before signing a non-guaranteed contract with the Toronto Raptors in the preseason.

Coaching changes
During the 2021 NBA Finals run on July 12, assistant coach Willie Green agreed to become the new head coach of the New Orleans Pelicans to enter this season. On July 25, the Suns agreed to hire Minnesota Timberwolves assistant coach Bryan Gates as a replacement to Willie Green going forward entering this season. On August 7, the Suns officially announced not just the promotion of Kevin Young to Willie Green's former position of associate head coach and the confirmed hiring of Bryan Gates, but also hired former NBA and NBA G League Ignite player Jarrett Jack and Oklahoma City Thunder player development coach Steve Scalzi to initially round out the rest of the coaching staff. On August 22, player development coach Riccardo Fois officially left his position with the Suns to become an assistant coach for the University of Arizona's Wildcats men's basketball team. Finally, on September 24, the Suns confirmed that both Riccardo Fois and Ben Strong left their positions as player development coaches for the team, being replaced by the Suns' assistant video coordinator Corey Vinson and the Portland Trail Blazers' video coordinator and player development coach Jamal Gross as a combination of video coordinator and player development coaches for the team. Not only that, but Fort Wayne Mad Ants assistant coach Michael Ruffin was confirmed to be the official assistant coach replacement for Steve Blake, with Jarrett Jack joining Steve Scalzi as player development assistant coaches going into this season.

Front offices changes and Robert Sarver controversy
On July 24, Jeff Bower had a mutual agreement with the Suns to officially leave his position as Vice President of Basketball Operations for them going forward. With Larry Fitzgerald confirmed to not be playing in the NFL for at least the majority of the 2021 Arizona Cardinals season, it is presumed likely that Fitzgerald will be given a much greater role with the Suns franchise going into this season under Robert Sarver's ownership group. However, a report from Jordan Schultz on October 22, 2021, suggested that ESPN was going to release a major exposé piece on majority team owner Robert Sarver with regards to rampant racism, sexism, and misogyny involved with him on the team both on and off the court throughout his entire tenure as team owner. While Sarver and other front office members explicitly denied any problems in mind there before the report's release, the actual report on Sarver was released on November 4, detailing all the problems involved with the majority of his time there. While Sarver and a majority of team personnel released public statements on their official website in response to the allegations at hand, the NBA began their investigations on the team's executive conduct the same day ESPN's report was released.

Roster

Salaries

For this season, the salary cap was set at $112,414,000, with the luxury tax line now being set at $136,606,000.

Preseason
After dealing with some changes to the preseason format for last season due to the COVID-19 pandemic, the NBA made sure to get their preseason period back into its proper starting point in early October going from this season onward, which includes a healthy amount of preseason games to start things out there. While the Suns were still playing in the 2021 NBA playoffs, the Los Angeles Lakers revealed their preseason schedule on June 29, which included a match with the Suns at home on October 6 and a road match in Los Angeles on October 10. Not only that, but on August 17, the Portland Trail Blazers revealed in their preseason schedule that the Suns would play at home against Portland on October 13, with them both revealing they were their final, respective preseason opponents this time around. Then on August 19, the Sacramento Kings revealed they were the first opponent the Suns will have in the preseason with a road game in Sacramento to start things out there. The Phoenix Suns later revealed those four games of theirs were officially their preseason schedule on August 25.

Before the start of their preseason period, Devin Booker was confirmed to be infected with COVID-19 despite getting the COVID-19 vaccine earlier in the previous season alongside the rest of the team playing there. Despite being able to return to practice early, Booker was held out for at least the majority of the preseason period, returning to play for only the final preseason game. Not only that, but the Suns' home games had to be moved to earlier times than originally scheduled due to the team focusing on their matches as doubleheader matches, with the Phoenix Mercury being considered the main events due to them competing in the 2021 WNBA Playoffs against the Las Vegas Aces and Chicago Sky after the Suns' respective matches against the Lakers and Trail Blazers on October 6 & 13. While their first and last preseason games on October 4 & 13 did not air on TV this season, the Suns had their preseason matches against the Lakers air on NBA TV and ESPN respectively for their October 6 & 10 games. After struggling against the Kings to start the preseason, Phoenix won both of their matches against the Lakers (even blowing the Lakers out 123–94 in their second match) before blowing out the Trail Blazers in a 119–74 win at home, finishing the preseason with a 3–1 record.

|- style="background:#fcc;"
| 1
| October 4
| @ Sacramento
| 
| Shamet, Smith (13)
| Jalen Smith (11)
| Cameron Payne (7)
| Golden 1 Center17,583
| 0–1
|- style="background:#cfc;"
| 2
| October 6
| L.A. Lakers
| 
| Mikal Bridges (15)
| Deandre Ayton (11)
| Chris Paul (11)
| Footprint Center12,434
| 1–1
|- style="background:#cfc;"
| 3
| October 10
| @ L.A. Lakers
| 
| Chris Paul (15)
| Ayton, McGee, Smith (9)
| Cameron Payne (7)
| Staples Center13,844
| 2–1
|- style="background:#cfc;"
| 4
| October 13
| Portland
| 
| Devin Booker (17)
| Deandre Ayton (11)
| Elfrid Payton (9)
| Footprint Center9,772
| 3–1

Regular season

Game log

|- style="background:#fcc;"
| 1
| October 20
| Denver
| 
| Mikal Bridges (16)
| Crowder, McGee (8)
| Chris Paul (10)
| Footprint Center16,074
| 0–1
|- style="background:#cfc;"
| 2
| October 22
| @ L.A. Lakers
| 
| Chris Paul (23)
| Deandre Ayton (15)
| Chris Paul (14)
| Staples Center18,997
| 1–1
|- style="background:#fcc;"
| 3
| October 23
| @ Portland
| 
| Devin Booker (21)
| Frank Kaminsky III (5)
| Chris Paul (11)
| Moda Center18,558
| 1–2
|- style="background:#fcc;"
| 4
| October 27
| Sacramento
| 
| Devin Booker (31)
| Deandre Ayton (21)
| Booker, Paul (8)
| Footprint Center14,678
| 1–3
|- style="background:#cfc;"
| 5
| October 30
| Cleveland
| 
| Devin Booker (27)
| Deandre Ayton (12)
| Chris Paul (10)
| Footprint Center14,516
| 2–3

|- style="background:#cfc;"
| 6
| November 2
| New Orleans
| 
| Mikal Bridges (22)
| Booker, Crowder (8)
| Chris Paul (18)
| Footprint Center14,323
| 3–3
|- style="background:#cfc;"
| 7
| November 4
| Houston
| 
| Devin Booker (27)
| Deandre Ayton (11)
| Chris Paul (13)
| Footprint Center15,058
| 4–3
|- style="background:#cfc;"
| 8
| November 6
| Atlanta
| 
| Devin Booker (38)
| Jae Crowder (8)
| Chris Paul (13)
| Footprint Center15,412
| 5–3
|- style="background:#cfc;"
| 9
| November 8
| @ Sacramento
| 
| Cameron Payne (24)
| Devin Booker (9)
| Devin Booker (6)
| Golden 1 Center13,566
| 6–3
|- style="background:#cfc;"
| 10
| November 10
| Portland
| 
| Frank Kaminsky (31)
| Booker, McGee (8)
| Chris Paul (7)
| Footprint Center15,672
| 7–3
|- style="background:#cfc;"
| 11
| November 12
| @ Memphis
| 
| Booker, Crowder (17)
| Cameron Johnson (7)
| Chris Paul (12)
| FedExForum15,886
| 8–3
|- style="background:#cfc;"
| 12
| November 14
| @ Houston
| 
| Devin Booker (26)
| Javale McGee (14)
| Devin Booker (6)
| Toyota Center16,088
| 9–3
|- style="background:#cfc;"
| 13
| November 15
| @ Minnesota
| 
| Devin Booker (29)
| Deandre Ayton (12)
| Chris Paul (8)
| Target Center16,279
| 10–3
|- style="background:#cfc;"
| 14
| November 17
| Dallas
| 
| Devin Booker (24)
| Deandre Ayton (13)
| Chris Paul (14)
| Footprint Center18,055
| 11-3
|- style="background:#cfc;"
| 15
| November 19
| Dallas
| 
| Booker, Bridges (19)
| Deandre Ayton (17)
| Chris Paul (14)
| Footprint Center17,071
| 12–3
|- style="background:#cfc;"
| 16
| November 21
| Denver
| 
| Cameron Johnson (22)
| Deandre Ayton (8)
| Chris Paul (10)
| Footprint Center16,072
| 13–3
|- style="background:#cfc;"
| 17
| November 22
| @ San Antonio
| 
| Devin Booker (23)
| Deandre Ayton (14)
| Landry Shamet (5)
| AT&T Center14,715
| 14–3
|- style="background:#cfc;"
| 18
| November 24
| @ Cleveland
| 
| Devin Booker (35)
| JaVale McGee (12)
| Chris Paul (12)
| Rocket Mortgage FieldHouse18,055
| 15–3
|- style="background:#cfc;"
| 19
| November 26
| @ New York
| 
| Devin Booker (32)
| Deandre Ayton (13)
| Chris Paul (10)
| Madison Square Garden19,812
| 16–3
|- style="background:#cfc;"
| 20
| November 27
| @ Brooklyn
| 
| Devin Booker (30)
| JaVale McGee (10)
| Chris Paul (11)
| Barclays Center18,071
| 17–3
|- style="background:#cfc;"
| 21
| November 30
| Golden State
| 
| Deandre Ayton (24)
| Deandre Ayton (11)
| Chris Paul (5)
| Footprint Center17,071
| 18–3

|- style="background:#cfc;"
| 22
| December 2
| Detroit
| 
| Johnson, Payne (19)
| Deandre Ayton (12)
| Chris Paul (12)
| Footprint Center16,081
| 19–3
|- style="background:#fcc;"
| 23
| December 3
| @ Golden State
| 
| Deandre Ayton (23)
| JaVale McGee (7)
| Chris Paul (8)
| Chase Center18,064
| 19–4
|- style="background:#cfc;"
| 24
| December 6
| San Antonio
| 
| Chris Paul (21)
| Ayton, Bridges (9)
| Chris Paul (10)
| Footprint Center15,292
| 20–4
|- style="background:#cfc;"
| 25
| December 10
| Boston
| 
| JaVale McGee (21)
| JaVale McGee (15)
| Chris Paul (12)
| Footprint Center17,071
| 21–4
|- style="background:#fcc;"
| 26
| December 13
| @ L.A. Clippers
| 
| Cameron Johnson (17)
| JaVale McGee (13)
| Chris Paul (8)
| Staples Center17,909
| 21–5
|- style="background:#cfc;"
| 27
| December 14
| @ Portland
| 
| Deandre Ayton (28)
| Deandre Ayton (13)
| Chris Paul (14)
| Moda Center16,184
| 22–5
|- style="background:#cfc;"
| 28
| December 16
| Washington
| 
| JaVale McGee (17)
| Deandre Ayton (10)
| Cameron Johnson (5)
| Footprint Center16,177
| 23–5
|- style="background:#cfc;"
| 29
| December 19
| Charlotte
| 
| JaVale McGee (19)
| Deandre Ayton (15)
| Chris Paul (9)
| Footprint Center17,071
| 24–5
|- style="background:#cfc;"
| 30
| December 21
| @ L.A. Lakers
| 
| Devin Booker (24)
| Deandre Ayton (11)
| Chris Paul (9)
| Staples Center18,997
| 25–5
|- style="background:#cfc;"
| 31
| December 23
| Oklahoma City
| 
| Devin Booker (30)
| Deandre Ayton (12)
| Booker, Paul (7)
| Footprint Center17,071
| 26–5
|- style="background:#fcc;"
| 32
| December 25
| Golden State
| 
| Chris Paul (21)
| Ayton. McGee (7)
| Chris Paul (8)
| Footprint Center17,071
| 26–6
|- style="background:#fcc;"
| 33
| December 27
| Memphis
| 
| Devin Booker (30)
| Jalen Smith (9)
| Chris Paul (13)
| Footprint Center17,071
| 26–7
|- style="background:#cfc;"
| 34
| December 29
| Oklahoma City
| 
| Devin Booker (38)
| Jalen Smith (14)
| Cameron Payne (7)
| Footprint Center17,071
| 27–7
|- style="background:#fcc;"
| 35
| December 31
| @ Boston
| 
| Devin Booker (22)
| Jalen Smith (7) 
| Chris Paul (8)
| TD Garden19,156
| 27–8

|- style="background:#cfc;"
| 36
| January 2
| @ Charlotte
| 
| Devin Booker (24)
| Jalen Smith (12) 
| Chris Paul (16)
| Spectrum Center19,088
| 28–8
|- style="background:#cfc;"
| 37
| January 4
| @ New Orleans
| 
| Devin Booker (33)
| Devin Booker (9)
| Chris Paul (15)
| Smoothie King Center15,158
| 29–8
|- style="background:#cfc;"
| 38
| January 6
| L.A. Clippers
| 
| Cameron Johnson (24)
| Jalen Smith (14)
| Chris Paul (10)
| Footprint Center17,071
| 30–8
|- style="background:#fcc;"
| 39
| January 8
| Miami
| 
| Devin Booker (26)
| Deandre Ayton (8)
| Chris Paul (7)
| Footprint Center17,071
| 30–9
|- style="background:#cfc;"
| 40
| January 11
| @ Toronto
| 
| Jae Crowder (19)
| Deandre Ayton (9)
| Chris Paul (12)
| Scotiabank Arena0
| 31–9
|- style="background:#cfc;"
| 41
| January 14
| @ Indiana
| 
| Devin Booker (35)
| Ayton, Smith (12)
| Chris Paul (9)
| Gainbridge Fieldhouse14,019
| 32–9
|- style="background:#cfc;"
| 42
| January 16
| @ Detroit
| 
| Devin Booker (30)
| Jae Crowder (11)
| Chris Paul (6)
| Little Caesars Arena18,178
| 33–9
|- style="background:#cfc;"
| 43
| January 17
| @ San Antonio
| 
| Devin Booker (48)
| Bismack Biyombo (14)
| Chris Paul (12)
| AT&T Center10,422
| 34–9
|- style="background:#cfc;"
| 44
| January 20
| @ Dallas
| 
| Devin Booker (28)
| Mikal Bridges (8)
| Chris Paul (11)
| American Airlines Center19,584
| 35–9
|- style="background:#cfc;"
| 45
| January 22
| Indiana
| 
| Mikal Bridges (23) 
| Bismack Biyombo (13)
| Chris Paul (16)
| Footprint Center17,071
| 36–9
|- style="background:#cfc;"
| 46
| January 24
| Utah
| 
| Devin Booker (33)
| Bismack Biyombo (13)
| Chris Paul (14)
| Footprint Center17,071
| 37–9
|- style="background:#cfc;"
| 47
| January 26
| @ Utah
| 
| Devin Booker (43)
| Devin Booker (12)
| Chris Paul (5)
| Vivint Arena18,306
| 38–9
|- style="background:#cfc;"
| 48
| January 28
| Minnesota
|  
| Devin Booker (29)
| Bismack Biyombo (12)
| Chris Paul (14)
| Footprint Center17,071
| 39–9
|- style="background:#cfc;"
| 49
| January 30
| San Antonio
| 
| Devin Booker (28) 
| Bismack Biyombo (11)
| Chris Paul (19)
| Footprint Center17,071
| 40–9

|- style="background:#cfc;"
| 50
| February 1
| Brooklyn
| 
| Devin Booker (35) 
| Mikal Bridges (8)
| Chris Paul (14)
| Footprint Center17,071
| 41–9
|- style="background:#fcc;"
| 51
| February 3
| @ Atlanta
| 
| Devin Booker (32)
| Deandre Ayton (9)
| Chris Paul (12)
| State Farm Arena16,958
| 41–10
|- style="background:#cfc;"
| 52
| February 5
| @ Washington
| 
| Deandre Ayton (20)
| Deandre Ayton (16)
| Chris Paul (9)
| Capital One Arena18,058
| 42–10
|- style="background:#cfc;"
| 53
| February 7
| @ Chicago
| 
| Devin Booker (38)
| Jae Crowder (10)
| Chris Paul (11) 
| United Center20,615
| 43–10
|- style="background:#cfc;"
| 54
| February 8
| @ Philadelphia
| 
| Devin Booker (35)
| Jae Crowder (14)
| Chris Paul (12)
| Wells Fargo Center20,720
| 44-10
|- style="background:#cfc;"
| 55
| February 10
| Milwaukee
| 
| Deandre Ayton (27)
| Crowder, Johnson (8)
| Chris Paul (19)
| Footprint Center17,071
| 45–10
|- style="background:#cfc;"
| 56
| February 12
| Orlando
|  
| Devin Booker (26)
| Deandre Ayton (10) 
| Chris Paul (15)
| Footprint Center17,071
| 46–10
|- style="background:#cfc;"
| 57
| February 15
| L.A. Clippers
| 
| Devin Booker (26)
| Deandre Ayton (12) 
| Chris Paul (14)
| Footprint Center17,071
| 47–10
|- style="background:#cfc;"
| 58
| February 16
| Houston
| 
| Devin Booker (24)
| Deandre Ayton (9)
| Devin Booker (8)
| Footprint Center17,071
| 48–10
|- align="center"
|colspan="9" bgcolor="#bbcaff"|All-Star Game
|- style="background:#cfc;"
| 59
| February 24
| @ Oklahoma City
| 
| Devin Booker (25)
| Ayton, McGee (8)
| Devin Booker (12)
| Paycom Center14,176
| 49–10
|- style="background:#fcc;"
| 60
| February 25
| New Orleans
| 
| Devin Booker (30)
| Torrey Craig (11)
| Mikal Bridges (6)
| Footprint Center17,071
| 49–11
|- style="background:#fcc;"
| 61
| February 27
| Utah
| 
| Devin Booker (30)
| Ayton, Booker, McGee (7)
| Devin Booker (7)
| Footprint Center17,071
| 49–12

|- style="background:#cfc;"
| 62
| March 2
| Portland
| 
| Cameron Johnson (20)
| JaVale McGee (9)
| Aaron Holiday (9)
| Footprint Center17,071
| 50–12
|- style="background:#cfc;"
| 63
| March 4
| New York
| 
| Cameron Johnson (38)
| Jae Crowder (7)
| Cameron Payne (16)
| Footprint Center17,071
| 51–12
|- style="background:#fcc;"
| 64
| March 6
| @ Milwaukee
| 
| Deandre Ayton (30)
| Deandre Ayton (8)
| Cameron Payne (8)
| Fiserv Forum17,495
| 51–13
|- style="background:#cfc;"
| 65
| March 8
| @ Orlando
| 
| Ayton, Shamet (21)
| Deandre Ayton (19)
| Cameron Payne (12)
| Amway Center14,024
| 52–13
|- style="background:#cfc;"
| 66
| March 9
| @ Miami
| 
| Devin Booker (23)
| JaVale McGee (15)
| Cameron Payne (10)
| FTX Arena19,600
| 53–13
|- style="background:#fcc;"
| 67
| March 11
| Toronto
| 
| Cameron Payne (24)
| JaVale McGee (8)
| Devin Booker (7)
| Footprint Center17,071
| 53–14
|- style="background:#cfc;"
| 68
| March 13
| L.A. Lakers
| 
| Devin Booker (30)
| Deandre Ayton (16)
| Cameron Payne (11)
| Footprint Center17,071
| 54–14
|- style="background:#cfc;"
| 69
| March 15
| @ New Orleans
| 
| Devin Booker (27)
| Holiday, McGee (6)
| Booker, Payne (8)
| Smoothie King Center16,789
| 55–14
|- style="background:#cfc;"
| 70
| March 16
| @ Houston
| 
| Devin Booker (36)
| Torrey Craig (14)
| Cameron Payne (11)
| Toyota Center18,055
| 56–14
|- style="background:#cfc;"
| 71
| March 18
| Chicago
| 
| Devin Booker (28)
| Deandre Ayton (12)
| Cameron Payne (7)
| Footprint Center17,071
| 57–14
|- style="background:#cfc;"
| 72
| March 20
| @ Sacramento
| 
| Devin Booker (31)
| Ayton, Craig (10)
| Aaron Holiday (7)
| Golden 1 Center17,583
| 58–14
|- style="background:#cfc;"
| 73
| March 23
| @ Minnesota
| 
| Deandre Ayton (35)
| Deandre Ayton (14)
| Cameron Payne (9)
| Target Center17,136
| 59–14
|- style="background:#cfc;"
| 74
| March 24
| @ Denver
| 
| Devin Booker (49)
| Deandre Ayton (7)
| Chris Paul (13)
| Ball Arena19,520
| 60–14
|- style="background:#cfc;"
| 75
| March 27
| Philadelphia
| 
| Devin Booker (35)
| Deandre Ayton (12)
| Chris Paul (14)
| Footprint Center17,071
| 61–14
|- style="background:#cfc;"
| 76
| March 30
| @ Golden State
| 
| Booker, Bridges (22)
| Deandre Ayton (16)
| Chris Paul (8)
| Chase Center18,064
| 62–14

|- style="background:#fcc;"
| 77
| April 1
| @ Memphis
| 
| Devin Booker (41)
| Ayton, McGee (12)
| Chris Paul (11)
| FedExForum17,794
| 62–15
|- style="background:#fcc;"
| 78
| April 3
| @ Oklahoma City
| 
| Mikal Bridges (18)
| Landry Shamet (7)
| Chris Paul (9)
| Paycom Center17,078
| 62–16
|- style="background:#cfc;"
| 79
| April 5
| L.A. Lakers
| 
| Devin Booker (32)
| Deandre Ayton (13) 
| Chris Paul (12)
| Footprint Center17,071
| 63–16
|- style="background:#fcc;"
| 80
| April 6
| @ L.A. Clippers
| 
| Ish Wainright (20)
| Bismack Biyombo (12)
| Aaron Holiday (7)
| Staples Center19,068
| 63–17
|- style="background:#cfc;"
| 81
| April 8
| @ Utah
| 
| Devin Booker (33)
| Deandre Ayton (10) 
| Chris Paul (16)
| Vivint Arena18,306 
| 64–17
|-  style="background:#fcc;"
| 82
| April 10
| Sacramento
| 
| Landry Shamet (27)
| JaVale McGee (13)
| Holiday, Shamet, Lundberg (5)
| Footprint Center17,071
| 64–18

Standings

Playoffs
For the second straight year in a row, the Suns were in the NBA Playoffs after previously experiencing a decade-long drought from it that started back in the 2010–11 season. It is their first time they reached the Playoffs in back-to-back seasons since the Seven Seconds Or Less era from around the 2004–05 season until the 2007–08 season. The NBA also continued utilizing the play-in tournament set-up that first began in the 2020 NBA Bubble, with this season also being the second one in a row where the play-in tournament has the seventh and eighth best teams in each conference compete for the seventh seed in each conference and the ninth and tenth seeds compete for a shot at the eighth seed for each conference instead. However, this is the first full-length season that will feature the same play-in tournament experiment from the previous season at hand.

Game log

|- style="background:#cfc;"
| 1
| April 17
| New Orleans
| 
| Chris Paul (30)
| Deandre Ayton (9)
| Chris Paul (10)
| Footprint Center17,071
| 1–0
|- style="background:#fcc;"
| 2
| April 19
| New Orleans
| 
| Devin Booker (31)
| Deandre Ayton (9)
| Chris Paul (14)
| Footprint Center17,071
| 1–1
|- style="background:#cfc;"
| 3
| April 22
| @ New Orleans
| 
| Ayton, Paul (28)
| Deandre Ayton (17)
| Chris Paul (14)
| Smoothie King Center18,962
| 2–1
|- style="background:#fcc;"
| 4
| April 24
| @ New Orleans
| 
| Deandre Ayton (23)
| Deandre Ayton (8)
| Chris Paul (11)
| Smoothie King Center18,962
| 2–2
|- style="background:#cfc;"
| 5
| April 26
| New Orleans
| 
| Mikal Bridges (31)
| Deandre Ayton (10)
| Chris Paul (11)
| Footprint Center17,071
| 3–2
|- style="background:#cfc;"
| 6
| April 28
| @ New Orleans
| 
| Chris Paul (33)
| Deandre Ayton (7)
| Chris Paul (8)
| Smoothie King Center 18,710
| 4–2

|- style="background:#cfc;"
| 1
| May 2
| Dallas
| 
| Deandre Ayton (25)
| Devin Booker (9)
| Devin Booker (8)
| Footprint Center17,071
| 1–0
|- style="background:#cfc;"
| 2
| May 4
| Dallas
| 
| Devin Booker (40)
| Jae Crowder (7)
| Chris Paul (8)
| Footprint Center17,071
| 2–0
|- style="background:#fcc;"
| 3
| May 6
| @ Dallas
| 
|Jae Crowder (19)
|Deandre Ayton (11)
|Devin Booker (8)
| American Airlines Center 20,077
| 2–1
|- style="background:#fcc;"
| 4
| May 8
| @ Dallas
| 
|Devin Booker (35)
|Deandre Ayton (11)
| Booker Paul (7)
| American Airlines Center20,610
| 2–2
|- style="background:#cfc;"
| 5
| May 10
| Dallas
| 
|Devin Booker (28)
|Deandre Ayton (9)
|Chris Paul (10)
| Footprint Center17,071
| 3–2
|- style="background:#fcc;"
| 6
| May 12
| @ Dallas
|
|Deandre Ayton (21)
|Deandre Ayton (11)
|Mikal Bridges (5)
| American Airlines Center20,777
| 3–3
|- style="background:#fcc;"
| 7
| May 15
| Dallas
|
|Cameron Johnson (12)
|Javale McGee (6)
|Chris Paul (4)
| Footprint Center17,071
| 3–4

Awards and records
From July 23-August 7, 2021, Devin Booker became the first Suns player to play for Team U.S.A. in an Olympiad setting since Shawn Marion and Amar'e Stoudemire in 2004. With the later agreed signing of center JaVale McGee on August 2 (which became official on August 17 after the branded 2020 Summer Olympics ended), Booker and McGee became the first Suns teammates (official or agreed upon) to play for Team U.S.A. since Marion and Stoudemire back in 2004 also.
With a 97–78 win over Australia on August 5 and an 87–82 win in their rematch against France, both Booker and McGee were named gold medalists for the branded 2020 Summer Olympics. They were not just the first medalists representing the Suns since Shawn Marion and Amar'e Stoudemire won their bronze medals in 2004, but they also became the first gold medalists while representing the Suns since Jason Kidd won a gold medal back in the year 2000.
On August 18, 2021, Jalen Smith was named a member of the All-Summer League First Team by averaging 16.3 points and a Las Vegas Summer League leading 12.5 rebounds in the four games he played for the Suns, with all four performances resulting in double-doubles for each game.
On September 11, 2021, former Suns head coach Cotton Fitzsimmons was posthumously inducted into the Naismith Basketball Hall of Fame as a contributor to the game of basketball.
Both former Suns players Charles Barkley and Steve Nash were named members of the NBA 75th Anniversary Team on October 19, 2021.
A day later, Chris Paul joined Barkley and Nash as the only other Suns players at that point in time to join the NBA 75th Anniversary Team, as well as was the only current Suns player to join that team. A day after that, Jason Kidd joined Paul, Nash, and Barkley as the few Suns players, former or current, to join the NBA 75.
On November 2, 2021, former Suns player and coach Paul Westphal and current Suns broadcaster Ann Meyers Drysdale were both inducted into the Arizona Sports Hall of Fame for their sporting contributions to the state of Arizona.

Awards

Week/Month

All-Star 
 Chris Paul – 12th All-Star Game
 Devin Booker – third All-Star Game
 Monty Williams – first NBA All-Star Game head coach

Records
On October 22, 2021, the team's second game of the season, Chris Paul became the 47th player in NBA history to reach 20,000 points for their career. Not only that, but he became the first player in league history to ever get to both 20,000+ points and 10,000+ assists in a career, getting his first eight points off of free-throws alone. Paul finished up the night with a double-double of 23 points and 14 assists in a 115–105 win over the Los Angeles Lakers.
On November 2, Chris Paul overtook both Mark Jackson and Steve Nash respectively to become the new third-highest assist creator of all-time, surpassing both former players in the second quarter of that game. Paul finished the night with another double-double performance, this time recording 14 points and 18 assists, in a 112–100 win at home over his first team, the New Orleans Pelicans.

Team records

Milestones
On October 30, 2021, Chris Paul tied Antawn Jamison as the 46th highest all-time scorer in NBA history with 16 points scored alongside 10 assists recorded in a 101–92 win over the Cleveland Cavaliers.
Two days later, on November 2, Paul overtook not just Jamison, but also former Suns player Tom Chambers' position to become the 45th highest all-time scorer in NBA history. He also overtook both Mark Jackson and former Suns player Steve Nash's positions for the all-time assist leaders to become the new third highest assist creator in league history behind only former Suns player Jason Kidd and John Stockton, finishing the night with a double-double of 14 points and 18 assists in a 112–100 win over the New Orleans Pelicans.

Team milestones
On October 30, 2021, Devin Booker overtook Phoenix Suns Ring of Honor member (and former assistant coach) Dan Majerle to become the second-greatest three-point shooter in franchise history, making two three-pointers to also break through the 800 made three-point shots barrier in a blowout loss to the Portland Trail Blazers.
On November 6, Devin Booker overtook Phoenix Suns Ring of Honor member (and former head coach) Paul Westphal to become the team's newest eighth highest scorer in franchise history. He finished the night off with a current season-high of 38 points in a 121–117 win over the Atlanta Hawks.
He also tied Amar'e Stoudemire for overall field goal attempts with the team by attempting 21 shots that night, tying Stoudemire at eighth for most field goal attempts in franchise history. Booker later surpassed him two days later on November 8 against the Sacramento Kings, while also being the 12th player in franchise history to break the 14,000 minutes played barrier with the Suns.

Injuries/Personal missed games

Transactions

Trades

Free agents

Re-Signed

Additions

Subtractions

References

Phoenix
Phoenix Suns seasons
Phoenix Suns
Phoenix Suns
2020s in Arizona